Genetic saturation is the result of multiple substitutions at the same site in a sequence, or identical substitutions in different sequence, such that the apparent sequence divergence rate is lower than the actual divergence that has occurred. In phylogenetics, saturation effects result in long branch attraction, where the most distant lineages have misleadingly short branch lengths. It also decreases phylogenetic information contained in the sequences.

Genetic saturation occurs most rapidly on fast evolving sequences, such as the hypervariable region of mitochondrial DNA, or in Short tandem repeat such as on the Y-chromosome.

See also 
Long branch attraction
Molecular clock
Human mitochondrial molecular clock
Convergent evolution

References 

Phylogenetics

Mitochondrial genetics
Genetic genealogy